Lard Kharan (also Romanized as Lard Kharān) is a village in Mohammadabad Rural District, in the Central District of Anbarabad County, Kerman Province, Iran. At the 2006 census, its population was 51, in 11 families.

References 

Populated places in Anbarabad County